This is a List of river films and television series.  The list includes films, TV Series, and documentaries that take place on a river or are about rivers and river explorers.

(The category country refers to country of film or show production facilities)

See also

Films titled 'River' 
 River disambiguation page that lists the River titles:
River (2007 film), a Canadian film by Mark Wihak
River (2011 film), a Japanese film
River (2015 Canadian film), a Canadian film by Jamie M. Dagg
River (2015 Tibetan film), a Tibetan film
River (TV series), a British television series
River, a 2022 Australian film by Jennifer Peedom

Films titled 'The River' 
 The River (1929 film), an American film by Frank Borzage
 The River (1933 film), a Czech film by Josef Rovenský
 The River (1938 film), an American film by Pare Lorentz
 The River (1951 film), a French film by Jean Renoir
 Nehir or The River, a 1977 Turkish film by Şerif Gören
 The River (1984 film), an American film by Mark Rydell
 The River (1997 film), a Taiwanese film by Tsai Ming-liang
 The River (2001 film), a Finnish film by Jarmo Lampela
 Reka (2002 film), a Russian film by Aleksey Balabanov
 The River (2018 film), a Kazakhstani film by Emir Baigazin

River Information 
 Lists of rivers
 List of river systems by length

References

External links 
 
 
 
 
 

River
River